The 2021 NJ/NY Gotham FC season is the team's twelfth season as a professional women's soccer team and their ninth season as a member of the National Women's Soccer League, the top division of women's soccer in the United States. It is the first season following the club's change of name from Sky Blue FC, which it played under from 2007 to 2020.

On May 2, Gotham qualified for the final of the NWSL Challenge Cup, marking the club's first appearance in a final since the 2009 Women's Professional Soccer playoffs. However, following a 1–1 draw with the Portland Thorns, Gotham were defeated 6–5 on penalties in the final.

On August 22, it was announced that head coach Freya Coombe would be taking over Angel City FC for the 2022 National Women's Soccer League season. Although initially slated to remain in her post for the remainder of the season, following concerns about possible conflicts of interest Coombe stepped down on August 29, with her final match in charge being a 1–0 defeat to the Orlando Pride on that day. Scott Parkinson was subsequently announced as Coombe's successor on August 31. On October 30, Gotham qualified for the NWSL playoffs for the first time since 2013, but were subsequently eliminated in the first round by the Chicago Red Stars.

Team

First-team roster

Coaching staff

Competitions

Overview

Preseason
Preseason training camp began on February 1, 2021. On the same day, Gotham FC announced a 28-player preseason roster, including four non-roster invitees. The club's first preseason friendly was announced on March 3, to be played behind closed doors. Another friendly, against fellow NWSL club Washington Spirit, was announced on March 7.

Matches

National Women's Soccer League

Regular season

Standings

Results summary

Results by matchday

Matches
The regular season schedule was announced on April 27, 2021.

Playoffs

Matches

Challenge Cup

The schedule for the 2021 NWSL Challenge Cup was announced on March 9, 2021. Under the rules of the competition, Gotham played four matches as part of the East Division. On April 5, the club announced a twenty-four player roster for the tournament.

Standings

Matches

Championship

As a result of their performances in the East Division of the 2021 NWSL Challenge Cup, in which Gotham FC went unbeaten, the club qualified for the championship match on May 2, 2021. However, because West Division champions Portland Thorns FC had a better overall record in the cup, Portland were selected as the home team for the final.

Squad statistics

Appearances

Goals

Assists

Shutouts

Disciplinary record

Transfers

2021 NWSL Draft

Transfers in

Transfers out

Loans in

Loans out

New contracts

Awards

NWSL annual awards
 Best XI:  Kailen Sheridan,  Caprice Dydasco,  Margaret Purce
 Second XI:  Ifeoma Onumonu
 Defender of the Year:  Caprice Dydasco

Monthly awards

NWSL Player of the Month

NWSL Team of the Month

Weekly awards

Challenge Cup

Save of the Week

National Women's Soccer League

NWSL Player of the Week

NWSL Save of the Week

References

External links
 

Sky Blue FC
Sky Blue FC
NJ/NY Gotham FC seasons
Sky Blue FC